In geometry, the Schiffler point of a triangle is a triangle center, a point defined from the triangle that is equivariant under Euclidean transformations of the triangle. This point was first defined and investigated by Schiffler et al. (1985).

Definition
A triangle  with the incenter  has its Schiffler point at the point of concurrence of the Euler lines of the four triangles . Schiffler's theorem states that these four lines all meet at a single point.

Coordinates
Trilinear coordinates for the Schiffler point are

or, equivalently,

where  denote the side lengths of triangle .

References

External links 
 

Triangle centers